Holliston Taylor Coleman is a former American actress. She is perhaps best known for starring in the Paramount feature film, Bless the Child, and her recurring role in the television series Medium.

Life and career
Coleman was born in Pasadena, California, the daughter of Doris Berg and Robert Moorhouse Coleman, Jr. She is the elder sister of actor Bobby Coleman. Coleman began acting at age four when, on her first theatrical audition, she booked the part of Horace Bing's daughter in the television series Dr. Quinn Medicine Woman.

At the age of 8, Coleman booked the title role as "the Child" (Cody) in the Paramount feature film Bless the Child, starring opposite Academy Award winner Kim Basinger. Coleman played an autistic child overwhelmed by messages from God and pursued by agents of evil. Coleman received over sixty positive reviews nationwide.

Coleman's most recent work includes a recurring role on Medium, as Hannah, the friend of Allison's daughter.

Coleman has received two Young Artist Award nominations.

Filmography

Television

Film

Awards

External links

Living people
20th-century American actresses
21st-century American actresses
Actresses from Pasadena, California
American child actresses
American film actresses
American television actresses
Film child actresses
Year of birth missing (living people)